Christopher Roland McGrath (born 29 November 1954) is a former professional footballer who played as a winger for Tottenham Hotspur, Millwall, Manchester United and Tulsa Roughnecks, and as an international for Northern Ireland.

Club career 
McGrath was born in Belfast, Northern Ireland. He joined Tottenham Hotspur as an apprentice in January 1972. Making his first class debut in 1973 and going on to make 46 appearances in all competitions including nine as substitute and scoring ten goals. McGrath featured in both legs of the 1974 UEFA Cup Final and collected a runner's up medal. In 1975, he joined Millwall in a loan deal where he made 15 appearances and scoring on 3 occasions. He transferred to Manchester United for £30,000 in October 1976 where he made 38 appearances and scoring once. McGrath left the club in February 1981 to join Tulsa Roughnecks in the NASL where he played to 1982.

International career 
McGrath represented Northern Ireland 21 times and scoring on four occasions.

His first international appearance was against Scotland on 11 May 1974, his last versus England on 19 May 1979.

Honours
Tottenham Hotspur
 UEFA Cup: runner-up 1974

External links 
 Fact -file
 Tottenham Hotspur F.C A-Z of players
 Biography

References

Living people
1954 births
Association footballers from Northern Ireland
Association footballers from Belfast
Association football midfielders
Northern Ireland international footballers
English Football League players
North American Soccer League (1968–1984) players
North American Soccer League (1968–1984) indoor players
Tottenham Hotspur F.C. players
Millwall F.C. players
Manchester United F.C. players
Tulsa Roughnecks (1978–1984) players
South China AA players
Expatriate association footballers from Northern Ireland
Expatriate sportspeople from Northern Ireland in the United States
Expatriate soccer players in the United States
Expatriate sportspeople from Northern Ireland in Hong Kong
Expatriate footballers in Hong Kong